Purple Dragon may refer to:
 Lamium maculatum, a plant
 Garden of the Purple Dragon, a fantasy novel
 A group of thugs called the Purple Dragons in the Teenage Mutant Ninja Turtles franchise.
 A military organisation called the Purple Dragons in the Forgotten Realms franchise.
 A standard computer science textbook Compilers: Principles, Techniques, and Tools